Matthias Bachinger was the defending champion but chose to compete in 2012 Strabag Prague Open instead.
Marinko Matosevic won the final against Ruben Bemelmans 6–3, 6–4.

Seeds

Draw

Finals

Top half

Bottom half

References
 Main Draw
 Qualifying Draw

Status Athens Open - Singles
2012 Singles